Jacob Lodwick (born July 25, 1981) is an American software engineer, serial entrepreneur and investor, best known as co-founder of Vimeo.

Education and early bio 
Lodwick was born and raised in Baltimore, Maryland and attended college at the Rochester Institute of Technology.

Biography

Lodwick was the initial web developer for CollegeHumor and the resulting Connected Ventures in 2004.  When he was a part of the founding team at Connected Ventures, Lodwick co-created Vimeo and came up with the name, a portmanteau of video and me.  In 2006 Vimeo was acquired by Barry Diller's IAC/Interactive Corp, and Lodwick was fired in late 2007.

After departing Vimeo in 2007, Lodwick went on to create and serve as the president of the Normative Music Company. In late 2009, Lodwick shut down the site, citing inexperience and lack of devotion.

Lodwick subsequently worked as an independent creative engineer, launching Pummelvision, software that assembles one's photos into stories with music. Pummelvision was inspired by a photo import feature which showed the current photo being imported.

Today Lodwick serves as CEO of the software company Keezy .

In the years since Vimeo's sale to IAC, Lodwick has invested in other technology startups including Tumblr and Makerbot.

Personal 
He lives in Brooklyn, New York.

References

External links 
 Official Website

American computer businesspeople
1981 births
Rochester Institute of Technology alumni
Living people
Vimeo